Disparoneura quadrimaculata, black-winged bambootail is a damselfly species in the family Platycnemididae. It is a widely distributed species in India.

Description and habitat
It is a medium sized damselfly with brick-red eyes, with two horizontal dark-red equatorial lines. Its thorax is bright brick-red on dorsum, paler on the sides. There is black and narrow mid-dorsal carina; a ante-humeral stripe; and a more or less broken but broad humeral-stripe. There is another broader irregular stripe on the mesepimeron, often broken up into two or more spots. There is a short stripe on the antero-lateral suture and a narrow stripe on the postero-lateral suture. The base of the lateral side is pale yellowish-red.

Its wings are transparent; but the fore-wings have a broad blackish-brown fascia, which extends from the node to the pterostigma. The hind-wings have a similar fascia which begins about 5 cells distal to the node and extends to the pterostigma. The pterostigma is bright ochreous, framed in thick black nervures.

Its abdomen is reddish-brown, marked with black. Segment a and segments 7 to 9 are black. Segments 2 to 6 are reddish-brown with broadly black on the apical ends. Segment 10 and anal appendages are pale brown. 

Female is more robust with extensive black markings. Its thorax and abdomen are greyish-brown. Abdomen is black on dorsum and with broad apical annules in white followed by black on segments 3 to 7. Segments 3 to 8 have small paired white spots at the base, enclosed in black. Segments 8 to 10 have white marks on dorsum. 

They are commonly found along streams and rivers, perches on emergent boulders and aquatic plants. It breeds in hill streams.

See also 
 List of odonates of India
 List of odonata of Kerala

References

External links

Platycnemididae
Insects of India
Insects described in 1842